Vasek Pospisil was the defending champion but chose not to defend his title.

J. J. Wolf won the title after defeating Stefan Kozlov 6–4, 6–4 in the final.

Seeds

Draw

Finals

Top half

Bottom half

References

External links
Main draw
Qualifying draw

Las Vegas Challenger - 1
2021 Singles